Big Hill is a summit in St. Francois County in the U.S. state of Missouri.
 
Big Hill was named for the fact it is larger than other nearby hills. A variant name was "Pole Hill".

References

Mountains of St. Francois County, Missouri
Mountains of Missouri